A market hall is a covered space or a building where food and other articles are sold from stalls by independent vendors. A market hall is a type of indoor market and is especially common in many European countries. A food hall, the most usual variation of a market hall, is "a large section of a department store, where food is sold" according to the Oxford English Dictionary.

Market halls and food halls can also be unconnected to department stores and operate independently, often in a separate building. A modern market hall may also exist in the form of what is nominally a gourmet food hall or a public market, for example in Stockholm's Östermalm Saluhall or Mexico City's Mercado Roma.

The terms "food hall" and "food court" must not be confused with each other. A food court means a place where the fast food chain outlets are located in a shopping mall. Unlike food courts made up of fast food chains, food halls typically mix local artisan restaurants, butcher shops and other food-oriented boutiques under one roof. The term "food hall" in the British sense, meaning an equivalent of a market hall, is increasingly used in the United States. In some Asia-Pacific countries, "food hall" is equivalent to a North American "food court", or the terms are used interchangeably.

See also
Pannier Market
Food hall
Cloth hall
Marketplace
Hawker centre

References

 
Food retailers